Massachusetts House of Representatives' 17th Suffolk district in the United States is one of 160 legislative districts included in the lower house of the Massachusetts General Court. It covers part of the city of Boston in Suffolk County. Since 1995, Kevin G. Honan of the Democratic Party has represented the district. 

The current district geographic boundary overlaps with those of the Massachusetts Senate's Middlesex and Suffolk district and 2nd Suffolk and Middlesex district.

Representatives

 Frederick Sheenan 
 James Conboy
 Daniel Murphy
 Joseph McGrath
 Coleman Kelly
 Patrick Sullivan
 Thomas Dorgan
 John Wickes
 Charles Louis Patrone
 James A. Burke
 Michael Paul Feeney
 John F. Melia
 Michael Daly 
 Daniel Pokaski 
 Kevin Fitzgerald 
 Kevin Honan

See also
 List of Massachusetts House of Representatives elections
 List of Massachusetts General Courts
 List of former districts of the Massachusetts House of Representatives

Images
Portraits of legislators

References

Further reading

External links
 Ballotpedia. Massachusetts House of Representatives Seventeenth Suffolk District
  (State House district information based on U.S. Census Bureau's American Community Survey).

House
Government of Suffolk County, Massachusetts